Japanese internment may refer to:
The internment of Japanese Americans in the United States during World War II
The internment of Japanese Canadians in Canada during World War II